Semigorovka is a rural locality (a village) in Tambovskoye Rural Settlement, Ternovsky District, Voronezh Oblast, Russia. The population was 57 as of 2010.

Geography 
Semigorovka is located on the right bank of the Semigorovka River, 43 km west of Ternovka (the district's administrative centre) by road. Tambovka is the nearest rural locality.

References 

Rural localities in Ternovsky District